Øivind Solheim (28 May 1928 – 24 July 2017) was a Norwegian ice hockey player. He played for the Norwegian national ice hockey team, and  participated at the Winter Olympics in 1952. He was a brother of Olympian ice hockey player Leif Solheim.

References

1928 births
2017 deaths
Ice hockey players at the 1952 Winter Olympics
Norwegian ice hockey players
Olympic ice hockey players of Norway
Ice hockey people from Oslo
Furuset Ishockey players